"No Doubt About It" is a song written by John Scott Sherrill and Steve Seskin, and recorded by American country music artist Neal McCoy.  It was released in December 1993 as the first single and title track from his album No Doubt About It.  McCoy's rendition was his breakthrough single release, becoming his first Number One country hit in early 1994.

Content
The song is a ballad in which the male narrator states that he and his lover were "meant to be together, no doubt about it."

Critical reception
Alanna Nash of Entertainment Weekly, in her review of No Doubt About It, called the song a "blander-than-generic ballad".

Music video
The music video was directed by Martin Kahan and premiered in early 1994. It features McCoy and a woman building a house in the countryside. It is entirely black-and-white.

Chart positions

Year-end charts

References

1993 singles
1993 songs
Neal McCoy songs
Songs written by John Scott Sherrill
Songs written by Steve Seskin
Song recordings produced by Barry Beckett
Atlantic Records singles